Angilaaq Mountain is a mountain in Qikiqtaaluk Region, Nunavut, Canada. It is the highest mountain on Bylot Island and lies in the Byam Martin Mountains, which is a northern extension of the Baffin Mountains.

See also
List of Ultras of North America

References

External links
"Angilaaq Mountain" on Mountain-forecast.com

Arctic Cordillera
Mountains of Qikiqtaaluk Region
One-thousanders of Nunavut